Fletcher Baker (born 26 December 1999) is a professional rugby league footballer who plays as a  forward for the Sydney Roosters in the National Rugby League .

Background
Baker played his junior rugby league for the Muswellbrook Rams.  Before making his first grade debut for the Sydney Roosters, he played for the club's feeder side North Sydney in the NSW Cup.

Career

2021
In round 2 of the 2021 NRL season, Baker made his NRL debut against the Wests Tigers at Campbelltown Stadium and scored a try in a 40–6 victory.

Baker played a total of 16 games for the Sydney Roosters in the 2021 NRL season including the club's two finals matches.  The Sydney Roosters would be eliminated from the second week of the finals losing to Manly 42-6.

References

External links
Roosters profile

1999 births
Living people
Australian rugby league players
Rugby league second-rows
Sydney Roosters players
North Sydney Bears NSW Cup players
Rugby league players from New South Wales